James Hiscott (January 21, 1826 – May 26, 1917) was a farmer and political figure in Ontario, Canada. He represented Lincoln in the Legislative Assembly of Ontario as a Conservative member from 1890 to 1898.

He was born in Niagara, Upper Canada in 1826, the son of Richard Hiscott, a soldier in the British army. In 1846, he married Hannah M. Reed. He served as reeve for Niagara Township and was warden for Lincoln County in 1884. Hiscott was a major in the local militia. He grew fruit on his farm near Virgil. He died on May 26, 1917 and is buried at St. Mark's Anglican Cemetery at Lincoln.

References

External links 
The Canadian parliamentary companion, 1897 JA Gemmill
Member's parliamentary history for the Legislative Assembly of Ontario

1826 births
1917 deaths
Progressive Conservative Party of Ontario MPPs
People from Niagara-on-the-Lake